In mathematics, loop algebras are certain types of Lie algebras, of particular interest in theoretical physics.

Definition
For a Lie algebra  over a field , if  is the space of Laurent polynomials, then

with the inherited bracket

Geometric definition 

is an infinite-dimensional Lie algebra with the Lie bracket given by

This is why it is called the loop algebra.

Gradation 
Defining  to be the linear subspace  the bracket restricts to a product

hence giving the loop algebra a -graded Lie algebra structure.

In particular, the bracket restricts to the 'zero-mode' subalgebra .

Derivation 

There is a natural derivation on the loop algebra, conventionally denoted  acting as

It is required to define affine Lie algebras, which are used in physics, particularly conformal field theory.

Loop group
The Lie algebra of a loop group is the corresponding loop algebra.

Affine Lie algebras as central extension of loop algebras

If  is a semisimple Lie algebra, then a nontrivial central extension of its loop algebra  gives rise to an affine Lie algebra. Furthermore this central extension is unique.

The central extension is given by adjoining a central element , that is, for all ,

and modifying the bracket on the loop algebra to

where  is the Killing form.

The central extension is, as a vector space,  (in its usual definition, as more generally,  can be taken to be an arbitrary field).

Cocycle 

Using the language of Lie algebra cohomology, the central extension can be described using a 2-cocycle on the loop algebra. This is the map

satisfying

Then the extra term added to the bracket is

Affine Lie algebra
In physics, the central extension  is sometimes referred to as the affine Lie algebra. In mathematics, this is insufficient, and the full affine Lie algebra is the vector space

where  is the derivation defined above.

On this space, the Killing form can be extended to a non-degenerate form, and so allows a root system analysis of the affine Lie algebra.

References

Lie algebras